Sir Frederic George Kenyon  (15 January 1863 – 23 August 1952) was a British palaeographer and biblical and classical scholar. He held a series of posts at the British Museum from 1889 to 1931. He was also the president of the British Academy from 1917 to 1921. From 1918 to 1952 he was Gentleman Usher of the Purple Rod.

Early life
Kenyon was born in London, the son of John Robert Kenyon, the Vinerian Professor of English Law at Oxford, and was thus great-grandson of Lloyd Kenyon, 1st Baron Kenyon. He was educated at Winchester College. He graduated BA from Magdalen College, Oxford, where he was later a fellow.

Career
Kenyon joined the British Museum in 1889 and rose to be its Director and Principal Librarian by 1909. He was knighted for his services in 1912 and remained at his post until 1931.

In 1891, Kenyon edited the editio princeps of Aristotle's Constitution of Athens. In 1920, he was appointed president of the British School of Archaeology in Jerusalem. He spent most of his retirement researching and publishing ancient papyri. He died on 23 August 1952.

Kenyon was a noted scholar of ancient languages, and made a lifelong study of the Bible, especially the New Testament as an historical text. His book Our Bible and the Ancient Manuscripts (1895) shows one way that Egyptian papyri and other evidence from archaeology can corroborate the narrative of historical events in the Gospels. He was convinced of the historical reality of the events described in the New Testament:
“the last foundation for any doubt that the Scriptures have come down to us substantially as they were written has now been removed.”

Personal life
Kenyon's eldest daughter was the British archaeologist Dame Kathleen Kenyon.

From 1899 to 1901 Frederic was Commanding Officer of the Roxeth & Harrow Company of the London Diocesan Church Lads' Brigade.

Works 
 1891: Ἀριστοτέλους Ἀθηναίων Πολιτεία. Aristotle on the Constitution of Athens; edited by F. G. Kenyon. London: Printed by order of the Trustees of the British Museum
 1891: Classical Texts from Papyri in the British Museum: Including the Newly Discovered Poems of Herodas, with Autotype Facsimiles of MSS; edited by F. G. Kenyon. London: British Museum.
 1895: Our Bible and the Ancient Manuscripts, Eyre and Spottiswoode, London, 1896
 1897: The Letters of Elizabeth Barrett Browning; edited with biographical additions by Frederic G. Kenyon. 2 vol. London: John Murray. Gutenberg fulltext
 1899: The Palaeography of Greek papyri: With Twenty Facsimiles and a Table of Alphabets
 1900: Facsimiles of Biblical Manuscripts in the British Museum Printed by Order of the Trustees. London.
 1901: Handbook to the textual criticism of the New Testament (1st ed.)
 1912: Handbook to the textual criticism of the New Testament (2nd ed.)
 1914: Aristotle, The Athenian Constitution; translated by Frederic G. Kenyon. London: G. Bell Gutenberg fulltext Wikisource fulltext
 1915: 
 1932: Books and Readers in Ancient Greece and Rome Oxford: Clarendon Press. (2nd ed. 1951)
 1933: Recent Developments in the Textual Criticism of the Greek Bible (Schweich Lectures for 1932) London: Oxford University Press
 1933–41: The Chester Beatty Biblical Papyri: Descriptions and Texts of Twelve Manuscripts on Papyrus of the Greek Bible. London: Emery Walker. (See Chester Beatty Papyri)
 1936: The Story of the Bible: A Popular Account of How It Came to Us London: J. Murray
 1940: The Bible and Archaeology. London: G. Harrap / New York: Harper & Row
 1948: The Bible and Modern Scholarship (Ethel M. Wood Lecture) London: J. Murray.

References

External links 

 
  
 
 
 The Master's Seminary Journal 1:10 (Spring 1999), 42

Fellows of Magdalen College, Oxford
1863 births
1952 deaths
Writers from London
Alumni of Magdalen College, Oxford
British biblical scholars
Directors of the British Museum
Knights Commander of the Order of the Bath
Knights Grand Cross of the Order of the British Empire
New Testament scholars
Presidents of the British Academy
People educated at Winchester College
Fellows of the British Academy
Knights Bachelor
Fellows of the Society of Antiquaries of London
Presidents of the Society of Antiquaries of London
Honorary Fellows of the British Academy
Presidents of the Classical Association